The Nanjing–Hangzhou passenger railway 
is a high-speed rail (maximum speed 350 km/h), passenger-dedicated line in eastern China between Nanjing (shorthand name ) and Hangzhou, the capitals of Jiangsu and Zhejiang provinces, respectively. During the planning and early construction stage, the railway was originally referred to as the Nanjing–Hangzhou intercity railway or Ninghang intercity railway. Recent publications don't use the "intercity" designation anymore, perhaps in recognition of the fact that the railway will be used not only by regional trains but long-distance trains as well.

The line is the first direct high-speed railway line between Nanjing and Hangzhou and reduced travel time by rail from nearly two hours to 50 minutes as direct trains no longer need to travel through Shanghai. Construction began in 2008 and the line was opened on July 1, 2013.

Near Huzhou, this railway runs parallel to the Xuancheng-Hangzhou railway. Connections between the two lines can be made at Huzhou railway station.

References

High-speed railway lines in China
Rail transport in Jiangsu
Rail transport in Zhejiang
 
Railway lines opened in 2013